Syeda Batool Fatima Naqvi (born 14 August 1982) is a Pakistani former cricketer who played as a wicket-keeper and right-handed batter. She appeared in one Test match, 83 One Day Internationals and 45 Twenty20 Internationals for Pakistan between 2001 and 2014. She played domestic cricket for Karachi and Zarai Taraqiati Bank Limited.

Career
She made her international debut in 2001, in a One Day International against the Netherlands.

In 2010, she was part of the Pakistan side that won gold at the 2010 Asian Games, in China.

She retired from international cricket following the 2014 Women's World T20.

References

External links
 
 

1982 births
Living people
Cricketers from Karachi
Pakistani women cricketers
Pakistan women Test cricketers
Pakistan women One Day International cricketers
Pakistan women Twenty20 International cricketers
Karachi women cricketers
Zarai Taraqiati Bank Limited women cricketers
Cricketers at the 2010 Asian Games
Asian Games gold medalists for Pakistan
Asian Games medalists in cricket
Medalists at the 2010 Asian Games